Ivan Čunčić (born 9 March 1985) is a Croatian footballer who plays in midfield for NK Zagorec Krapina.

References

1985 births
Living people
Footballers from Zagreb
Association football midfielders
Croatian footballers
NK Zagreb players
NK Vrapče players
HNK Segesta players
NK Lučko players
NK Zagorec Krapina players
Croatian Football League players
First Football League (Croatia) players